Aleksandar Bućan (born July 14, 1973) is a Serbian professional basketball coach who is a youth system coordinator of the Basketball Federation of Serbia

Coaching career 
Bućan had multiple stints with Partizan NIS youth selections. He also coached senior teams of Napredak Kruševac, Swisslion Vršac, Radnički Zastava, Tamiš and Železničar.

National teams 
Youth
Bućan coached the under-16 men's selection of the Serbia and Montenegro national team. At 2006 FIBA Europe Under-16 Championship, his team won the bronze medal.

Bućan coached youth men's selections of the Serbia national team (under-18, under-19, under-20). At the 2013 FIBA Europe Under-18 Championship, Serbia finished 6th among 16 teams. At the 2014 FIBA Europe Under-18 Championship Serbia won silver medal. At the 2015 FIBA Under-19 World Championship, Serbia finished 9th among 16 teams. At the 2016 FIBA Europe Under-20 Championship, Serbia finished 11th among 16 teams.

In November 2022, the Basketball Federation of Serbia hired Bućan as their new youth system coordinator.
Senior
On May 21, 2007, Bućan has been appointed head coach of the India national basketball team. At the 2007 FIBA Asia Championship, India finished 15th among 16 teams. At the 2009 FIBA Asia Championship, India finished 13th among 16 teams.

References

External links
 Aleksandar Bucan at fibaeurope.com
 Coach Profile at eurobasket.com
 

1973 births
Living people
KK Lions/Swisslion Vršac coaches
KK Napredak Kruševac coaches
KK Radnički KG 06 coaches
KK Tamiš coaches
KK Železničar Inđija coaches
KK Vizura coaches
Serbian men's basketball coaches
Serbian expatriate basketball people in India
Sportspeople from Belgrade